GO Remixed is an album by Christian pop and rock band Newsboys. It was released on 8 May 2007. The song "City to City" is featured in the 2011 film Cars 2.

Track listing

Accolades

In 2008, the album was nominated for a Dove Award for Pop/Contemporary Album of the Year at the 39th GMA Dove Awards.

References

Newsboys albums
2007 remix albums
Inpop Records remix albums